Lapovo (selo) is a village situated in Lapovo municipality in Serbia.

References

Populated places in Šumadija District